A Glass and a Cigarette is a 1955 Egyptian melodrama directed by Niazi Mostafa. It stars Samia Gamal and it is also the first film to feature Dalida (then known as Dalila) in a supporting role.

Plot
Hoda (Gamal) is a very famous entertainer in her thirties. She marries Mamdouh Samy (Nabil Al alfi), a young surgeon and leaves her colourful life behind. Hoda helps Mamdouh found a hospital but their marriage is jeopardised by Italian head nurse Iolanda's (Dalida) attraction to Mamdouh. Hoda contemplates that her husband and Iolanda are running an affair and seeks indulgence in drinking and smoking.

Cast
Samia Gamal: Hoda Gamal
Nabil Al alfi: Mamdouh Samy
Dalida: Iolanda
Seraj Munir: Omara
Kouka: Azza

References

External links

1955 films
1950s Arabic-language films
1955 drama films
Egyptian black-and-white films
Egyptian drama films
Melodrama films